Haliella is a genus of sea snails, marine gastropod mollusks in the family Eulimidae.

Species

Species within this genus include the following:
 Haliella abyssicola (Bartsch, 1917)
 Haliella canarica (Bouchet & Warén, 1986)
 Haliella chilensis (Bartsch, 1917)
 Haliella seisuimaruae Takano, Kimura & Kano, 2020
 Haliella stenostoma (Jeffreys, 1861)
 † Haliella tyrrhena Di Geronimo & La Perna, 1999
 Haliella ventricosa Feng, 1996

Species brought into synonymy
 Haliella geographica (de Folin, 1887): synonym of  Haliella stenostoma (Jeffreys, 1861)
 Haliella lomana (Dall, 1908): synonym of  Eulimella lomana (Dall, 1908)

References

 Monterosato, T. A. (di). (1878). Enumerazione e sinonimia delle Conchiglie mediterranee. Giornale di scienze naturali ed economiche di Palermo. 13: 61-115

External links
 Monterosato, T. A. (di). (1878). Enumerazione e sinonimia delle Conchiglie mediterranee. Giornale di scienze naturali ed economiche di Palermo. 13: 61-115

Eulimidae